Ocote  is a common name for various species of pine trees in the genus Pinus that occur in the Spanish speaking Americas—Latin America.

They include:
Pinus apulcensis
Pinus ayacahuite
Pinus cooperi
Pinus devoniana
Pinus durangensis
Pinus gordoniana
Pinus greggii
Pinus hartwegii
Pinus herrerae
Pinus jaliscana
Pinus leiophylla
Pinus lumholtzii
Pinus maximinoi
Pinus montezumae
Pinus oocarpa
Pinus patula
Pinus pringlei
Pinus pseudostrobus
Pinus rzedowskii
Pinus tecunumanii
Pinus teocote

See also
 
 

Pinus taxa by common names
Flora of Central America
Flora of Mexico
Flora of South America